Prince Gyeongnyeong (6 January 1403 – 15 October 1458) was a Royal Prince of the Joseon Dynasty as the fourth son of King Taejong and his concubine, Royal Noble Consort Hyo of the Cheongpung Kim clan.

Life 
Yi Bi was born on 6 January 1403 (In the lunar calendar: 13 December 1402) to King Taejong and Royal Noble Consort Hyo of the Cheongpung Kim clan. Prior to becoming the king’s concubine, Lady Kim was originally a maid at Min household who had been with Queen Wongyeong before she became queen. The prince was born after his mother entered the palace and King Taejong ascended the throne. 

It said that he was kind-hearted and had strong filial piety. Yi was excellent at academics and taught his little brothers how to write.

It’s said that his legal mother, Queen Wongyeong, and his biological mother did get along after his birth. But despite this, Yi Bi had a good relationship with his older brother, Yi Do (the future King Sejong) as well as his legal mother, and also helped the young prince with his education.

In governamental affairs, when there were difficulties in the royal family and in state affairs, the Prince tried to solve them with allegiance. For five generations, including Taejong, Sejong, Munjong, Danjong, and Sejo, he was loyal to and cooperated with the government.

In February 1416 (the 16th year of King Taejong), the 13-year-old prince and his younger half-sister, the 12-year-old Princess Jeongseon, married. The prince married the daughter of Kim Gwan while the princess married Nam Hui.

In 1419 (the 1st year of King Sejong), he became a teacher at the order of King Taejong, and went to Beijing in the Ming dynasty. He came back with gifts.

During the mourning period after Queen Wongyeong died in 1420, it’s said that the prince scolded and argued with his father for having an affair with a Kisaeng named Im Jeom-hong (일점홍, 一點紅). Rather than punishing the prince, King Sejong felt touched that his older brother reprimanded their father during a time of grief.

After King Sejo ascended to the throne, he moved to Chungju to spend the rest of his life there.

His tomb is situated on Geumsan Mountain, Chungju, Chungcheong Province, South Korea.

Family 
 Father: King Taejong of Joseon (13 June 1367 - 30 May 1422) (태종 조선)
 Paternal Grandfather: Taejo of Joseon (October 27, 1335 – May 24, 1408)
 Paternal Grandmother: Queen Sinui of the Anbyeon Han clan (September 1337 – October 21, 1391) (신의왕후 한씨)
 Mother: Royal Noble Consort Hyo of the Cheongpung Kim clan (? – 1454) (효빈 김씨)
 Wives and their issues:
 Princess Consort Cheongwon of the Cheongpung Kim clan (청원군부인 청풍 김씨); daughter of Kim Gwan (김관, 金灌)
 Son: Yi Jil, Prince Goyang (고양군 질; ? - 13 May 1449)
 Granddaughter: Lady Yi of the Jeonju Yi clan (전주 이씨)
 Granddaughter: Lady Yi of the Jeonju Yi clan (전주 이씨)
 Son: Yi Chan, Prince Euncheon (은천군 찬; 1421 - 1481)
 Daughter-in-law: Princess Consort Park of the Unbong Park clan (현부인 운봉 박씨)
 Grandson: Yi Jeong, Prince Ahrim (아림군 정)
 Grandson: Yi Jae (이재)
 Grandson: Yi Jeo (이저)
 Grandson: Yi Ju (이주)
 Grandson: Yi Bang (이방)
 Granddaughter: Lady Yi of the Jeonju Yi clan (전주 이씨)
 Grandson-in-law: Gu Hyo-geun (구효근, 具孝勤)
 Granddaughter: Lady Yi of the Jeonju Yi clan (전주 이씨)
 Grandson-in-law: Jo Wi (조위, 趙瑋)
 Son: Yi Chi, Prince Ohseong (오성군 치)
 Daughter-in-law: Princess Consort Jeong of the Palgye Jeong clan (현부인 팔계 정씨)
 Grandson: Yi Kang, Prince Pungseong (풍성군 강)
 Granddaughter: Lady Yi of the Jeonju Yi clan (전주 이씨)
 Son: Yi Ri (이리)
 Daughter-in-law: Lady Yun of Musong Yun clan (무송 윤씨); daughter of Yun Gyeong-won (윤경원)
 Granddaughter: Lady Yi of the Jeonju Yi clan (전주 이씨)
 Granddaughter: Lady Yi of the Jeonju Yi clan (전주 이씨)
 Princess Consort Ma of the Kaesongbu Ma clan (군부인 개성부 마씨)
 Son: Yi Jik, Prince Moyang (모양군 직; 1438 - 1511)
 Daughter-in-law: Princess Consort Shin of Pyeongsan Shin clan (현부인 평산 신씨)
 Grandson: Yi Jang-son (이장손)
 Grandson: Yi Mi-su (이미수)
 Granddaughter: Lady Yi of the Jeonju Yi clan (전주 이씨)
 Granddaughter: Lady Yi of the Jeonju Yi clan (전주 이씨)
 Daughter-in-law: Princess Consort Kang of the Goksan Kang clan (현부인 곡산 강씨)
 Grandson: Yi Seung-gon, Prince Seonsa (선사군 승곤)
 Grandson: Yi Ge-son, Prince Seoheung (서흥군 게손)
 Princess Consort Choi of the Jeonju Choi clan (군부인 전주 최씨)
 Son: Yi Su (이수) (1444 - ?)
 Daughter-in-law: Princess Consort Heo of the Yangcheon Heo clan (신부인 양천 허씨)
 Grandson: Yi Gwon (이권)
 Grandson: Yi Hwan (이환)
 Grandson: Yi Beol (이벌)
 Grandson: Yi Je (이제)
 Granddaughter: Lady Yi of the Jeonju Yi clan (전주 이씨)
 Grandson-in-law: Kim Bong-seon (김봉선)
 Granddaughter: Lady Yi of the Jeonju Yi clan (전주 이씨)
 Grandson-in-law: Gu Su-bok (구수복)
 Grandson: Yi Gyo (이교)
 Granddaughter: Lady Yi of the Jeonju Yi clan (전주 이씨)
 Granddaughter: Lady Yi of the Jeonju Yi clan (전주 이씨)
 Unnamed concubine
 Son: Yi Geo (이거)
 Daughter-in-law: Lady Seo of the Icheon Seo clan (이천 서씨); daughter of Seo Woo (서우)
 Granddaughter: Lady Yi of the Jeonju Yi clan (전주 이씨)
 Granddaughter: Lady Yi of the Jeonju Yi clan (전주 이씨)
 Son: Yi Jeok (이적)
 Daughter-in-law: Lady Shin (신씨, 辛 氏); daughter of Shin Shin (신신, 辛信) 
 Son: Yi Yeong, Prince Bokseong (복성군 영) (1435 - 1487)
 Daughter-in-law: Princess Consort Seo of the Icheon Seo clan (신부인 이천 서씨)
 Grandson: Yi Eun-san (이은산)
 Grandson: Yi Ok-san (이옥산)
 Grandson: Yi Geum-san, Prince Geumreung (이금산 금릉군)
 Son: Yi Chu, Prince Garim (가림군 추; 1441 - ?)
 Grandson: Yi Jeong (이정)
 Grandson: Yi Hyeon-son (이현손)
 Grandson: Yi Woo, Prince Gongsan (이우 공산군)
 Daughter: Lady Yi of the Jeonju Yi clan (전주 이씨)
 Son-in-law: Jeong Seok-gyun (정석균, 鄭石均)
 Daughter: Lady Yi of the Jeonju Yi clan (전주 이씨)
 Son-in-law: Song Gye-heung (송계흥, 宋繼興)

In popular culture 
 Portrayed by Yoon Young-joon in The Great King, Sejong (2008)

Notes

References 

1403 births
1458 deaths
15th-century Korean poets
Korean princes
Korean Confucianists
15th-century Korean philosophers
House of Yi
Joseon dynasty
15th-century Korean calligraphers